Agylla barbipalpia is a moth of the family Erebidae. It was described by William Schaus in 1899. It is found in Paraná, Brazil.

References

Moths described in 1899
barbipalpia
Moths of South America
Moths of Central America